The Roman Catholic Diocese of Jelgava is a diocese located in the city of Jelgava in the Ecclesiastical province of Riga in Latvia.

History
 2 December 1995: Established as Diocese of Jelgava from the Diocese of Liepāja

Leadership
 Bishops of Jelgava (Roman rite)
 Antons Justs (7 Dec 1995 – 22 July 2011)
 Edvards Pavlovskis (22 July 2011 – present)

See also
Roman Catholicism in Latvia
List of Roman Catholic dioceses in Latvia

Sources
 GCatholic.org
 Catholic Hierarchy
 Diocese website

References

Jelgava
Roman Catholic dioceses in Latvia
Christian organizations established in 1995
Roman Catholic dioceses and prelatures established in the 20th century